Baddowal is a village in Batala in Gurdaspur district of Punjab State, India. The village is most of belong to Pawar caste small population there was a man who serve for Indian army for 26 years but after retirement torture by local area police and causing death administrated by Sarpanch an elected representative of the village.

See also
List of villages in India

References 

Villages in Gurdaspur district